Chowderguda is a village in Ranga Reddy district of the Indian state of Telangana. It is located in Shamshabad mandal of Rajendranagar revenue division.

References 

Villages in Ranga Reddy district